Franco Loi (21 January 1930 – 4 January 2021) was an Italian poet, writer, and essayist. He was born in Genoa, and died in Milan, aged 90.
He made his debut in 1973 as a poet using dialect and had a good success with the work I cart, and the following year, 1974, with Poems of love. In 1975 the poet proves to have reached complete maturity of expression with the poem Stròlegh, published by Einaudi with a preface by Franco Fortini.
In 1978 Einaudi published the collection Teater and in 1981 the work L'Angel followed by Edizioni San Marco dei Giustiniani. Also in 1981, thanks to the collection L'aria, he won the "Lanciano" national prize for dialectal poetry.
In 2005 he published L'aria de la memoria for Einaudi, in which he collected all the poems written between 1973 and 2002.
He has been Honorary President of the Contemporary Arts Centre of Cilento and Milan founded in 2019 by Menotti Lerro, and, starting from 2020, member of the Empathic School Movement / Empathism.
In 2019 he won the Cilento Poetry Prize conferred to him at Accademia di Belle Arti di Brera.

Works

I cart, Milano, Edizioni Trentadue, 1973.
Poesie d'amore, incisioni di Ernesto Treccani, San Giovanni Valdarno (Firenze), Edizioni Il Ponte, 1974.
Stròlegh, introduzione Franco Fortini, Torino, Einaudi, 1975.
Teater, Torino, Einaudi, 1978.
L'angel, Genova, Edizioni San Marco dei Giustiniani, 1981.
Lünn, Firenze, Il Ponte, 1982.
Bach, Milano, Scheiwiller, 1986.
Liber, Milano, Garzanti, 1988.
Memoria, Mondovì (CN), Boetti & C., 1991.
Poesie, Roma, Fondazione Piazzola, 1992.
Umber, Lecce, Piero Manni, 1992.
Poesie, Roma, Fondazione Marino Piazzolla, 1992.
L'angel, in 4 parti, Milano, Mondadori, 1994.
Arbur, Bergamo, Moretti & Vitali, 1994.
Verna, Roma, Empiria, 1997.
Album di famiglia, Falloppio (CO), Lietocolle, 1998.
Amur del temp, Milano, Crocetti Editore, 1999.
Isman, Milano, Einaudi, 2002.
Aquabella, Novara, Interlinea edizioni, 2004.
El bunsai, Milano, Il ragazzo innocuo, 2005
La lûs del ver, Milano, Quaderni di Orfeo, 2006.
Scultà, Milano, Il ragazzo innocuo, 2006
I niul, Novara, Interlinea edizioni, 2012.
Nel scûr, Milano, Quaderni di Orfeo, 2013.
La torre, Edizioni San Marco dei Giustiniani, Genova, 2020.
L'angel, Mondadori, Milano, 2022, collana Lo Specchio.

References

External links

Menotti Lerro interview Franco Loi in his home of Milan (2018)
Franco Loi, Una città in versi
Franco Loi receive the Cilento Poetry Prize at the Accademia di Belle Arti di Brera 2019 - AUDIO VIDEO 
Franco Loi Honorary President of The Contemporary Arts Centre of Milan and Cilento; interview with Menotti Lerro
Franco Loi "Perchè scrivo poesie"

1930 births
2021 deaths
Italian male poets
People from Genoa
Italian essayists
Male essayists
20th-century Italian poets
20th-century essayists
20th-century Italian male writers